The 1879 Coleridge by-election was a by-election held on 8 May 1879 in the  electorate in the Canterbury region of New Zealand during the 6th New Zealand Parliament.

The by-election was caused by the resignation of the incumbent MP Cathcart Wason on 14 April 1879.

The by-election was won by George Hart. He was unopposed, and "little interest was taken in the election".

References

Coleridge 1879
1879 elections in New Zealand
Politics of Canterbury, New Zealand
May 1879 events